"What's Love" is the third and final single from rapper Shaggy's seventh studio album, Intoxication. The song features guest vocals from Akon. The song was released on November 14, 2008. A French version of the song was recorded, featuring vocals from Lord Kossity. It was released in France in September 2008. The video for the song was directed by Hype Williams.

Reception
AllMusic stated that in his crossover songs, like this one, "Shaggy is more discerning than ever and makes sure the radio-friendly material is right in line with his skill set."

Track listing
 CD Single
 "What's Love" (Original Album Edit) – 3:08
 "What's Love" (New Radio Edit) - 3:08
 "What's Love" (Extended Version) – 4:03'''''

 "What's Love" (Big Room Mix) – 6:33
 "Feel The Rush" (Extended Mix) - 5:00
 "What's Love" (Video - New Radio Edit Version) - 3:08

 French CD Single
 "What's Love" (Remix Feat. Lord Kossity) – 2:54
 "What's Love" (Extended Remix Feat. Lord Kossity) – 3:52

Charts

Weekly charts

Year-end charts

References

2007 singles
Shaggy (musician) songs
Akon songs
Music videos directed by Hype Williams
Songs written by Akon
2007 songs
Songs written by Shaggy (musician)
VP Records singles